Team Northumbria may refer to various sports teams representing Northumbria University. These include:

 Team Northumbria (basketball)
 Team Northumbria F.C. 
 Team Northumbria (netball)